Oxberry is an unincorporated community located in Grenada County, Mississippi, United States and part of the Grenada Micropolitan Statistical Area .

Oxberry is named for James Oxberry, who was a Choctaw interpreter and owned the surrounding land where the community developed.

The community was once home to a saw mill and cotton gin.

A post office operated under the name Oxberry from 1891 to 1908.

Oxberry was once located on the Rankin-Memphis Road, which was a road built through Choctaw lands prior to the Treaty of Dancing Rabbit Creek.

References

Unincorporated communities in Mississippi
Unincorporated communities in Grenada County, Mississippi